St John the Evangelist Catholic High School, or the colloquial St John's, is an independent co-educational secondary day school, located in Nowra, New South Wales, Australia. The school provides a religious and general education to Catholic and non-Catholic families. Administered by the Catholic Education Office of the Diocese of Wollongong, the Catholic systemic school caters for students from Year 7 to Year 12 and serves the Shoalhaven and surrounding regions.

St John's has approximately 1,000 students, most of whom come from Catholic families.

History
St John's was founded in 1989. Up until 1967 there was a Catholic secondary school provided at St Michael's school, but it was closed and Catholic students then had to attend the local state high schools, Shoalhaven High School and Nowra High School, with some families opting to send their children to the Catholic boarding school in the Southern Highlands, Chevalier College.

St John the Evangelist High School was founded in 1990. The first principal was Carmel Bambridge. The Sisters of the Good Samaritan had worked in the Nowra Parish since 1893, particularly in the area of the Catholic Education in St Michael's School and State Schools of the region. The Good Samaritans were founded in 1857 by Archbishop John Bede Polding to work with convict women, and then moved into the field of Catholic Education. Polding's patron saint was St John the Evangelist, and as a Benedictine monk he adapted the rule of St Benedict for the Good Samaritan Congregation. The official feast day for the school is that of St John the Evangelist which is celebrated on 27 December each year. Since this falls during the summer school holidays, the feast day is celebrated near Pentecost.

House system
BenedictYellow (formerly Cuthbert)
Originally named after Australian athlete Betty Cuthbert, the House name was changed in 2005. Named after St Benedict.

ChisholmRed (formerly Bradman)
Originally named after Australian cricketer Donald Bradman, the House name was changed in 2005. Named after Caroline Chisholm.

MacKillopPurple
Formed in 2005 as the fifth house and named after St. Mary MacKillop, the founder of the Sisters of St Joseph of the Sacred Heart

McCabeBlue (formerly Goolagong)
Originally named after Australian tennis player Evonne Goolagong Cawley, the House name was changed in 2005. Named after Bishop Thomas McCabe, the first Bishop of the Catholic Diocese of Wollongong.

PoldingOrange
Formed in 2006 as the sixth house and named after Archbishop John Polding, the first Roman Catholic Bishop in Australia and founder of the Sisters of the Good Samaritan.

PurcellGreen (formerly Elliott)
Originally named after Australian athlete Herb Elliott, the House name was changed in 2005. Named after Monsignor John Purcell, the Parish Priest at the time of the schools' opening and one of the founders of the school.

Curriculum
St John’s offers a limited range of subjects. In years 11 and 12, students begin to work towards the Higher School Certificate (HSC), which allows them to either enter university, TAFE, college, or the workforce. Whilst the HSC years are not compulsory in NSW, they are popular for students at St John’s, as many students leave St John’s post-HSC to study at the University of Wollongong. As with all Catholic schools in the Catholic Diocese of Wollongong, religious education is compulsory in all years including years 11 and 12.

See also

 List of Catholic schools in New South Wales
 Catholic education in Australia

References

External links
 St John's Website
 St John's Moodle
 St Michael's Parish, Nowra
 St Michael's Catholic Primary School
 University of Wollongong
 Wollongong Catholic Education Office
 Good Samaritans

Nowra, New South Wales
Educational institutions established in 1990
1990 establishments in Australia
Catholic secondary schools in New South Wales